Vitali Trubila (born 7 January 1985) is  a Belarusian former football player.

Career
Born in Brest, Trubila began his career playing for the youth side of FC Dinamo Minsk. He played for Darida Minsk Raion during the 2005 season.

In January 2006, the midfielder moved to Czech Gambrinus liga side Baník Most. Most sent Trubila on a six-month loan with FC Tescoma Zlín in January 2009. When he returned from the loan, he was transferred to Slavia Prague.

On 3 June 2011, Trubila made his debut for the Belarus national football team, playing the full match against France.

His brother Pavel Trubila is also a professional footballer.

Honours
Dinamo Minsk
Belarusian Premier League champion: 2004

References

External links
 
 
 
 

1985 births
Living people
Belarusian footballers
Association football midfielders
Belarus international footballers
Belarusian expatriate footballers
Expatriate footballers in the Czech Republic
Expatriate footballers in Russia
Czech First League players
FC Dinamo-Juni Minsk players
FC Dinamo Minsk players
FC Darida Minsk Raion players
FK Baník Most players
FC Fastav Zlín players
SK Slavia Prague players
Bohemians 1905 players
FC Gomel players
FC Sokol Saratov players
FC Shakhtyor Soligorsk players
FC Minsk players
FC Slutsk players
Sportspeople from Brest, Belarus